Robert Irsay (March 5, 1923 – January 14, 1997) was an American professional football team owner. He owned the National Football League (NFL)'s Baltimore/Indianapolis Colts franchise from 1972 until his death in 1997.

Early life and education
Irsay was born on March 5, 1923, in Chicago, the son of Charles Irsay (born Charles Israel) and Elaine Nyitrai, Jewish immigrants from Hungary. In 1942 he joined the United States Marine Corps. In 1946 he was hired by his father's heating and ventilation business. In 1951 Irsay founded his own business, the Robert Irsay Co., and sold the business to Zurn Industries about a year before purchasing the Colts in 1972.

Career
Irsay assumed ownership of the Baltimore Colts on July 13, 1972, after acquiring the Los Angeles Rams from the estate of Dan Reeves and swapping franchises with Carroll Rosenbloom, all made official on the same day. His last-minute US $19 million bid for the Rams was $2 million more than that of future Tampa Bay Buccaneers owner Hugh Culverhouse. Irsay's majority share in the Colts was initially 51%, with Willard Keland of Racine, Wisconsin, owning the rest. He additionally announced the appointment of Joe Thomas as Baltimore's new general manager, succeeding Don Klosterman who accompanied Rosenbloom to Los Angeles.

Irsay's first controversial act with the Colts was his changing of head coaches from Howard Schnellenberger to general manager Joe Thomas after a 30–10 defeat to the Philadelphia Eagles at Veterans Stadium on September 29, 1974, which extended the team's season-opening losing streak to three. While stalking the Colts sideline during the second half, he voiced his preference for Bert Jones as the starting quarterback over Marty Domres by asking Schnellenberger about when he was going to make such a change. Schnellenberger's sarcastic reply resulted in his postgame dismissal. Irsay had first gone to the press box to inform Thomas that he was the new head coach and then to the locker room to announce his actions to the Colts players before breaking the news to Schnellenberger in a heated discussion in the coaches office. Middle linebacker Mike Curtis voiced the players' displeasure by saying, "This just tears me up. In defense of Irsay, he's a nice guy, an emotional guy. He doesn't know a lot about football but sometimes you lose control in an emotional situation."

Irsay's verbal abuse of his players after a loss in a final preseason match to the Detroit Lions at the Pontiac Silverdome on September 2, 1976, led to head coach Ted Marchibroda's resignation three days later on September 5. Marchibroda was also at odds with Thomas over player personnel decisions. He was rehired two days later on September 7 after offensive and defensive coordinators Whitey Dovell and Maxie Baughan threatened to quit and the players considered boycotting practice, all in support of Marchibroda.

Irsay's dysfunctional relationships with certain players in contract disputes and coaches accelerated the Colts' on-field decline in the ensuing years. He was accused of bad faith bargaining and racial discrimination by running back Lydell Mitchell who was eventually sent to the San Diego Chargers on August 23, 1978. Defensive end John Dutton contended that Irsay had spread "too many lies" about him and sat out the early part of the 1979 campaign while demanding a trade. He added, "I don't think he cares about the team, it's just a toy to him." Dutton was dealt to the Dallas Cowboys on October 9, 1979. Irsay also continually second-guessed Marchibroda.

Move

In January 1984 Irsay appeared before the Baltimore media and exclaimed, "This is my team!" He reiterated that, despite problems, the rumors that he was moving the team were untrue. With negotiations over improvements to Memorial Stadium at an impasse, one of the chambers of the Maryland state legislature passed a law on March 27, 1984, allowing the city of Baltimore to seize the Colts under eminent domain, which city and county officials had threatened to do. Irsay claimed the city promised him a new football stadium, something they later denied, citing the team's poor attendance. The next day, fearing a dawn raid on the team's Owings Mills headquarters, Irsay accepted a deal offered by the city of Indianapolis.

Indianapolis Mayor, William H. Hudnut III, contacted John Burnside Smith, then CEO of the Mayflower Transit Company, who arranged for fifteen trucks to pack the team's property hurriedly and transport it to Indianapolis in the early hours of the morning of March 29. An ecstatic crowd in Indianapolis greeted the arrival of its new NFL team, and the team received 143,000 season ticket requests in just two weeks.

Baltimore was without a National Football League team until another controversial move in 1996, when Art Modell brought the personnel of the Cleveland Browns there to become the Baltimore Ravens.

After Irsay's death in Indianapolis on January 14, 1997, the Colts were inherited by his son, Jim, who serves as CEO. Bill Polian handled the day-to-day operations of the team as vice-chairman until his dismissal after the 2011 season.

Irsay is one of the members of the Indianapolis Colts Ring of Honor, being inducted on September 23, 1996.

Personal life
In 1946, Irsay married Harriet Pogorzelski, the daughter of Polish Catholic immigrants. They raised their children Catholic. They had three children – Thomas, Roberta and Jim. Roberta was killed in an automobile accident in 1971 on I-294 outside Chicago. Thomas, who lived with a severe mental disability, lived in a Florida facility until his death in 1999 at the age of 45. Jim is now the CEO and principal owner of the Colts. Irsay, who had divorced from Harriet, married Nancy Clifford on June 17, 1989, at Second Presbyterian Church in Indianapolis; Hudnut officiated the ceremony. Nancy Irsay died November 7, 2015, at the age of 65.

Health decline
Irsay suffered a stroke in November 1995 and was in intensive care at St. Vincent Indianapolis Hospital for several months. After his release he developed pneumonia, heart and kidney problems, for which he was transferred to the Mayo Clinic in Rochester, Minnesota. He died in Indianapolis on January 14, 1997. He is interred at Crown Hill Cemetery.

Notes

References

1923 births
1997 deaths
American people of Hungarian-Jewish descent
Jewish American sportspeople
Indianapolis Colts owners
Los Angeles Rams owners
Businesspeople from Chicago
Burials at Crown Hill Cemetery
20th-century American businesspeople
Jewish American military personnel
United States Marine Corps personnel of World War II
20th-century American Jews